Barbara Brenner (October 7, 1951 - May 10, 2013) was an American breast cancer activist, after activist and legal work on several other causes, including anti-Vietnam War activism, women's rights, civil rights, and employment discrimination.  She led the organization Breast Cancer Action, which critiqued orthodoxy regarding the cancer, with which she had been diagnosed in 1993 and 1996.  She was partners for 38 years with Suzanne Lampert, her partner since graduate school at Princeton University. She died at the age of 61 on May 10, 2013.

Notes

External links
 SF Chronicle obituary
 Sjoholm, Barbara (Editor) (2016). So Much To Be Done: The Writings of Breast Cancer Activist Barbara Brenner. University of Minnesota Press, USA. 

1951 births
2013 deaths
American health activists
21st-century American LGBT people
20th-century American women lawyers
20th-century American lawyers
21st-century American women